The 2015 Santiago Challenger was a professional tennis tournament played on clay courts. It was the first edition of the tournament which was part of the 2015 ATP Challenger Tour. It took place in Santiago, Chile between 19 and 25 October 2015.

Singles main-draw entrants

Seeds

 1 Rankings are as of October 12, 2015.

Other entrants
The following players received wildcards into the singles main draw:
  Vicente Lagos
  Gonzalo Lama
  Bastián Malla
  Marcelo Tomás Barrios Vera

The following players received entry from the qualifying draw:
  Francisco Bahamonde
  Gonzalo Escobar
  Thiago Monteiro
  Carlos Eduardo Severino

Champions

Singles

  Rogério Dutra Silva def.  Horacio Zeballos, 7–5, 3–6, 7–5.

Doubles

  Guillermo Durán /  Máximo González def.  Andrej Martin /  Hans Podlipnik, 7–6(8–6), 7–5.

References

Santiago Challenger